Robert Munro "Bob" Wolterstorff (August 29, 1914 – April 24, 2007) was first bishop of the Episcopal Diocese of San Diego. Born in St. Paul, Minnesota, he was a graduate of St. Ambrose College in Davenport, Iowa, and Seabury-Western Theological Seminary in Evanston, Illinois. He was consecrated Bishop of San Diego on March 30, 1974, and served until 1982.

See also 
List of bishops of the Episcopal Church in the United States of America

External links 
Robt. Wolterstorff, 92; first Episcopal bishop of San Diego
Robert M. Wolterstorff, first bishop of San Diego, dies at 92

1914 births
2007 deaths
American Episcopal priests
Clergy from Saint Paul, Minnesota
20th-century American Episcopalians
Episcopal bishops of San Diego
20th-century American clergy